José Juan Vázquez Gómez (born 14 March 1988), also known as Gallito, is a Mexican professional footballer who plays as a defensive midfielder for Liga MX club Tijuana.

Club career

Celaya
José Juan Vázquez began playing football professionally at the age of 19 in the fourth and third divisions of Mexico with teams such as Atlético San Francisco and Atlético Comonfort in the fourth division, and for Cuervos Negros de Zapotlanejo, América Manzanillo, and finally his home town team Celaya in the third division.

During his stay with Celaya, he was a part of the squad that achieved promotion to the Liga de Ascenso (Second Division) for the Clausura 2011 tournament. Vázquez made his second division debut with Celaya on 29 July 2011 against Leones Negros in which he played the entire 90 minutes of the game and subsequently became an undisputed starter for the rest of the season. Vázquez eventually was loaned to Club León for the Clausura 2012 tournament, one season after accomplishing promotion with Celaya.

León
Vázquez arrived at León on 12 December 2011 on loan while the team was still playing the Liga de Ascenso. In his first season, he started in every match, being substituted only once. During the Clausura tournament, León won the league final, giving them the right to play the Promotional final against Correcaminos, which they won by an aggregate score of 6–2, and earning promotion to the first division. Vázquez was eventually bought by León in May 2012.

On 15 December 2013, León defeated América in the Apertura final at the Estadio Azteca to win their first title since their promotion and the sixth overall in the club's history. In the following tournament, Vázquez played a vital role in Leon's back-to-back championship win after defeating Pachuca in the final on 14 May 2014, playing all 90' minutes of the final at the Estadio Hidalgo.

Guadalajara
In the Clausura 2017 championship finals, he scored Guadalajara's second goal in the second leg, contributing to an aggregate score of 4–3 and helping Chivas win their twelfth league title.

Santos
On 18 November 2017, it was confirmed that Vázquez was to join Santos Laguna.

Return to Guadalajara
On 9 December 2019, Váquez returned to Guadalajara.

On 5 November 2020, Vazquez was separated from the first team.

International career
Vázquez received his first international call up to the senior national team on 23 January 2014, under coach Miguel Herrera for a friendly match against South Korea held in the United States in preparation for the 2014 FIFA World Cup. He started the match and played 55' minutes, being substituted out for Jesús Zavala. Mexico went on to win the match 4–0.

After few participations with the national team Vázquez was included in Miguel Herrera's final 23-man list participating in the 2014 FIFA World Cup held in Brazil on 8 May. He made his World Cup debut on 13 June against Cameroon in the Arena das Dunas. Vázquez in total completed 61 passes and recovered three balls in his first match. He was a starter in Mexico's second match against host nation Brazil in which the match ultimately ended in a 0–0 draw. In total, Vázquez has a 95.2% completed pass rate in the World Cup tournament so far. Vázquez was a starter in Mexico's final group stage match against Croatia, in which he received a yellow card and missed the match against The Netherlands.

Career statistics

International

Honours
Celaya
Segunda División de México: Torneo Independencia 2010

León
Ascenso MX: Clausura 2012
Liga MX: Apertura 2013, Clausura 2014

Guadalajara
Liga MX: Clausura 2017
Copa MX: Clausura 2017
Supercopa MX: 2016

Santos Laguna
Liga MX: Clausura 2018

Mexico
CONCACAF Gold Cup: 2015

Individual
Liga MX Best Defensive Midfielder: 2016–17
Liga MX Best XI: Clausura 2018

References

External links

 
 
 
 
 

1988 births
Living people
Association football midfielders
Footballers from Guanajuato
Mexico international footballers
People from Celaya
Club Celaya footballers
Club León footballers
Liga MX players
2014 FIFA World Cup players
2015 CONCACAF Gold Cup players
CONCACAF Gold Cup-winning players
Mexican footballers
C.D. Guadalajara footballers
Santos Laguna footballers
Deportivo Toluca F.C. players